Fighting Blood may refer to:
 Fighting Blood (1911 film), an American short silent Western film
 Fighting Blood (1951 film), a short Australian documentary